Chad J. Plummer (born November 30, 1975) is a former American and Canadian football wide receiver in the National Football League and Canadian Football League. He was drafted by the Denver Broncos in the sixth round of the 1999 NFL Draft. He also played for the Indianapolis Colts, Toronto Argonauts, Winnipeg Blue Bombers and Hamilton Tiger-Cats. He played college football at Cincinnati as a quarterback and wide receiver. He was the MVP of the 1997 Humanitarian Bowl.

References

1975 births
Living people
Sportspeople from Delray Beach, Florida
Players of American football from Florida
American football wide receivers
American football quarterbacks
Canadian football wide receivers
Cincinnati Bearcats football players
Indianapolis Colts players
Toronto Argonauts players
Winnipeg Blue Bombers players
Hamilton Tiger-Cats players